Thomas Bulkeley ( – 1708), of  Caernarvonshire, was a Welsh politician.

Family
Bulkeley was the fourth son of Thomas Bulkeley, 1st Viscount Bulkeley, and Blanche Coytmore. He married Jane, daughter of Griffith Jones of Castellmarch, Carnarvonshire and widow of Thomas Williams of Dinas. They had no children.

Education and career
Bulkeley matriculated from Jesus College, Oxford, in 1652 and was admitted to Gray's Inn in 1654. He was a Member of the Parliament of England for Beaumaris (1690–1695), Caernarvonshire (1679 – March 1681, 1685–87 and 10 February 1697 – 1705), Anglesey (1689–1690) and Caernarvon Boroughs (1705 – 23 March 1708) which from 1707 was for the Parliament of Great Britain.

References

1633 births
1708 deaths
17th-century Welsh politicians
People from Caernarfonshire
Thomas
Younger sons of viscounts
Alumni of Jesus College, Oxford
Members of Gray's Inn
Members of the Parliament of England (pre-1707) for constituencies in Wales
English MPs 1679
English MPs 1680–1681
English MPs 1685–1687
English MPs 1689–1690
English MPs 1695–1698
English MPs 1698–1700
English MPs 1701
English MPs 1701–1702
English MPs 1702–1705
English MPs 1705–1707
Members of the Parliament of Great Britain for Welsh constituencies
British MPs 1707–1708
Members of Parliament for Caernarfon
Members of the Parliament of England for Beaumaris